Pressath is a municipality  in the district of Neustadt an der Waldnaab, in Bavaria, Germany. Pressath was founded in 1657.  It is situated 20 km northwest of Weiden in der Oberpfalz and ca. 7 km north of Grafenwöhr.

References

Neustadt an der Waldnaab (district)